Nilüfer Yanya (born 11 May 1995) is an English singer, songwriter and musician.

Early life
Yanya is the daughter of two visual artists, her mother is of Irish and Barbadian heritage and her father is Turkish. Yanya grew up in Chelsea, London listening to Turkish music and classical music playing at home. She gravitated to guitar rock and learned how to play the instrument at the age of 12.

Career
Informally starting her musical career with demos uploaded to SoundCloud in 2014, Yanya turned down an offer to join a girl group produced by Louis Tomlinson of One Direction and focused on developing her own music instead. She has spoken out against this model of talent acquisition, telling The Guardian: "'Let's go and pinch some young people, tell them we're going to make a really successful group but we're obviously going to make a lot more money than them.' It's a very selfish thing to do." The project was reportedly abandoned after a year.

Her first EP, Small Crimes/Keep on Calling, was released in 2016. Her second EP, Plant Feed, was released in 2017, followed by Do You Like Pain? in 2018.

In 2019, Yanya released her debut studio album, Miss Universe, which received rave reviews and critical acclaim, with critics noting her ability to bounce back and forth between musical and lyrical styles, shifting between "gimlet-eyed composure and cataclysmic panic". Yanya's music has been described as nervous and restless, combining influences from indie rock to soul, jazz, and trip hop. A Stereogum review called her voice "malleable and endlessly expressive."

In 1-2 July 2022, Yanya performed before Adele's first live UK concert after five years, in Hyde Park. Yanya is currently the UK starter act for rock band Roxy Music who reformed in 2022 for a 50th anniversary tour.

Musical style
Les Inrockuptibles has likened her material to the likes of King Krule, Siouxsie and the Banshees, Parquet Courts and the Breeders.

Personal life
Yanya has tried to embrace her Turkish heritage more as an adult and started taking Turkish lessons.

She likes to involve her family in her career, with her younger sister Elif sometimes performing with her as a backing singer and her elder sister Molly directing her music videos.

Yanya stated in a Turkish interview that her mother lived in Turkey with her father when they were expecting her, and she often heard the Turkish pop singer Nilüfer's name on the radio. She loved the name so much that she said, "If I have a daughter, I will name her Nilüfer."

Discography
Studio albums
 Miss Universe (2019)
 Painless (2022)

EPs
 Small Crimes/Keep on Calling (2016)
 Plant Feed (2017)
 Do You Like Pain? (2018)
 Feeling Lucky? (2020)
 Inside Out (2021)

References

External links
  – official site
 
 
 
 Nilüfer Yanya: Tiny Desk (Home) Concert, National Public Radio, 22 July 2020

1995 births
Living people
Alternative rock guitarists
Alternative rock singers
ATO Records artists
British indie rock musicians
English rock keyboardists
English rock singers
English people of Barbadian descent
English people of Irish descent
English people of Turkish descent
Musicians from London
21st-century English women singers
21st-century English singers